WSJN-CD (channel 20) is a Class A CTNi-operated television station licensed to San Juan, Puerto Rico. The station is owned by Wanda Rolon and operated by Christian Television Network, along with satellite station WQSJ-CD (virtual channel 48, UHF digital channel 23) in Quebradillas, Puerto Rico. WSJN-CD shares transmitter facilities with WELU (channel 34) at the Monte Renovados La Peña in Bayamon. The station has its studios and offices located at Barrio Piñas in Toa Alta.

History 

WSJN-CD began operations in 1990, and it was owned by Ministerio Codech en Avance, Inc. Prior to this, WSJN-CD and WQSJ-CD were affiliated with Telecadena SBN between 1999 and 2013. In 2013, the stations switched affiliations to the CTNi Television Network.

Digital television 
WSJN-CD's digital signal is multiplexed:

WQSJ-CD's digital signal is multiplexed:

References

External links
Tabernaculo de Alabanza y Adoracion La Senda Antigua

Low-power television stations in the United States
SJN-CD
Mass media in San Juan, Puerto Rico
Christian Television Network affiliates
1990 establishments in Puerto Rico
Television channels and stations established in 1990